The name Dinah has been used for eight tropical cyclones in the Western Pacific Ocean.

 Typhoon Dinah (1952) (T5202) - hit Japan
 Typhoon Dinah (1959) (T5919)
 Typhoon Dinah (1965) (T6510, 13W, Huling)
 Typhoon Dinah (1967) (T6730, 37W, Uring) - hit Japan
 Typhoon Dinah (1974) (T7405, 06W, Bising)
 Typhoon Dinah (1977) (T7710, 14W, Openg)
 Typhoon Dinah (1984) (T8406, 06W)
 Typhoon Dinah (1987) (T8712, 12W, Luding)

In the Australian region:
 Cyclone Dinah (1967)

See also 
 Hurricane Diana (disambiguation)
 Tropical Storm Diane (disambiguation)

Pacific typhoon set index articles